The William and Ann Bringhurst House, is a historic residence within the Springville Historic District in Springville, Utah, United States, that is listed on the National Register of Historic Places (NRHP).

Description
The house is located at 306 South 200 West and was built in 1856. It includes Greek Revival and Mid 19th Century Revival architecture. It was built of adobe in 1856, and was extended c.1895 and again in 1955.

Some design work was by Solomon D. Chase.

It was listed on the NRHP in 1998and is an individually listed contributing property to the Springville Historic District.

See also

 National Register of Historic Places listings in Utah County, Utah
 James P. and Lydia Strang House, also NRHP-listed, nearby, and mistakenly reported as having address that is in fact the address of the Bringhurst House

References

External links

Houses completed in 1856
Georgian architecture in Utah
Greek Revival houses in Utah
Houses on the National Register of Historic Places in Utah
Houses in Utah County, Utah
National Register of Historic Places in Utah County, Utah
Buildings and structures in Springville, Utah
Individually listed contributing properties to historic districts on the National Register in Utah